Freedom is a settlement in the U.S. state of Georgia established in September 2020, in the wake of a breakdown of race relations after the killing of several African Americans, including the murder of Ahmaud Arbery in Georgia. It was created by 19 African-American families who together purchased  of land in Wilkinson County, near Macon, with the goal of incorporating a city that is a "safe haven for people of color".

History 
Freedom was inspired by a June 2020 viral false news story that the nearby town of Toomsboro, Georgia, was for sale. Although Toomsboro was not for sale as the town's mayor explained, a large amount of rural land near the town was available for purchase. They brought together 19 African-American families who raised the money to purchase the land. As of September 2020, the settlement consists of a campground, and its founders are working on establishing roads and utility services before beginning building residences. Currently, the settlement consists of more than  throughout two parcels.

See also 
Eatonville, Florida
Mound Bayou, Mississippi
Nicodemus, Kansas
Soul City, North Carolina
National Movement for the Establishment of a 49th State

References

External links 

2020 establishments in Georgia (U.S. state)
African Americans in Georgia (U.S. state)
Populated places in Georgia (U.S. state)
Intentional communities in the United States